The Supreme Court of the United States handed down eighteen per curiam opinions during its 2015 term, which began October 5, 2015 and concluded October 2, 2016.

Because per curiam decisions are issued from the Court as an institution, these opinions all lack the attribution of authorship or joining votes to specific justices. All justices on the Court at the time the decision was handed down are assumed to have participated and concurred unless otherwise noted.

Court membership

Chief Justice: John Roberts

Associate Justices: Antonin Scalia (died February 13, 2016), Anthony Kennedy, Clarence Thomas, Ruth Bader Ginsburg, Stephen Breyer, Samuel Alito, Sonia Sotomayor, Elena Kagan

Maryland v. Kulbicki

Mullenix v. Luna

White v. Wheeler

James v. Boise

Amgen Inc. v. Harris

Wearry v. Cain

V.L. v. E.L.

Caetano v. Massachusetts

Woods v. Etherton

Zubik v. Burwell

Kernan v. Hinojosa

Johnson v. Lee

Lynch v. Arizona

See also 
 List of United States Supreme Court cases, volume 577
 List of United States Supreme Court cases, volume 578

Notes

References

 

United States Supreme Court per curiam opinions
Lists of 2015 term United States Supreme Court opinions
2015 per curiam